The AVN Award for Female Performer of the Year is presented every January in Las Vegas, Nevada at the AVN Awards ceremony sponsored and presented by the American adult video industry trade magazine Adult Video News (AVN). It represents the female porn star who has had the best body of work in the previous year. It has been given annually since 1993.

Tori Black was the first two-time winner, winning back-to-back in 2010 and 2011. Angela White was the first three-time winner, winning back-to-back-to-back in 2018, 2019 and 2020. Kira Noir became the first black woman to win the award in 2023.

Winners and nominees

1990s

2000s

2010s

2020s

Multiple wins and nominations

Multiple wins

Three or more nominations

See also
 AVN Award for Best Actress
 AVN Award for Best Supporting Actress
 AVN Award for Female Foreign Performer of the Year
 AVN Award for Transsexual Performer of the Year
 AVN Award for Male Performer of the Year
 AVN Award for Male Foreign Performer of the Year
 AVN Award for Best Actor
 AVN Award for Best Supporting Actor

References

External links
 

Female Performer of the Year
Awards established in 1993
Awards for actresses